Dev, sometimes capitalized as DEV, can be referred as:

People

Single names
Dev (born 1982), Indian actor
Dev (born 1984), British radio presenter, DJ and actor
Dev (born 1989), American singer
Dev, Indian actor

First names
 Dev Anand (1923–2011), Indian actor
 Dev Griffin (born 1984), British DJ
 Dev Hynes (born 1985), British musician
 Dev Kumar (born 1972), Indian writer
 Dev Patel (born 1990), British actor

Surnames
 Aditya Dev (born 1988), Indian body builder with dwarfism
 Ajinkya Dev, Indian actor
 Angad Dev (1504–1552), Sikh guru 
 Arjan Dev (1563–1606), Sikh guru
 Deepak Dev (born 1978), Indian composer
 Gokul Inder Dev (born 1938), Indian cricketer
 Govinda Chandra Dev (1907–1971), Bangladeshi philosophy professor 
 I. H. Sangam Dev, Indian investigative journalist
 K. J. Kapil Dev, Indian volleyball player 
 Kanhad Dev (fl. 1298–1299), Indian maharaja 
 Kapil Dev (born 1959), Indian cricketer
 Kesava Dev (1904–1983), Indian writer
 Mukul Dev, Indian actor 
 Nanak Dev (1469–1539), Sikh guru
 Rahul Dev (born 1968), Indian actor and model
 Rajan P. Dev (1951–2009), Indian actor

Entertainment
 Dev (2004 film), a Hindi film
 Dev.D, a 2009 Hindi film
 Dev (2019 film), a Tamil film
 Dev (TV series), a 2017 Indian television show
 Devs, a 2020 American miniseries

Technology
 , a directory in the Unix file system
 DEVS, discrete event system specification

Other uses
 Éamon de Valera, Irish politician sometimes known colloquially as Dev
 Dev (mythology), monstrous ogre or fiend in Iranian mythology and mythologies influenced by it
 DEV, Chapman code for Devon, a county in the west of England

See also
Deva (disambiguation)
Developer (disambiguation)